King Island, Kings Island or King's Island may refer to:

Australia
 King Island (Queensland)
 King Island, at Wellington Point, Queensland 
 King Island (Tasmania)
 King Island Council, the local government area that contains the Tasmanian island

Canada
 King Island (British Columbia)
 King Island (Nunavut)
 King Island (Saskatchewan)
King Island, Newfoundland and Labrador, a settlement

United States
 King Island (Alaska)
 King Island (California)
 Kings Island (California)
 King's Island (Connecticut)
 King's Island (Pennsylvania)
 Kings Island, amusement park in Mason, Ohio

Elsewhere
 King Island, Burma
 King Island (New Zealand)
 King Peninsula, Antarctica, originally believed to be an island ("King Island") but later discovered to be a peninsula